Kotków  is a village in the administrative district of Gmina Gorzkowice, within Piotrków County, Łódź Voivodeship, in central Poland.

The local time zone is named Europe / Warsaw with an UTC offset of one hour. The closest airport in Poland is Częstochowa-Rudniki in a distance of 26 mi (or 42 km), South-West. There are several UNESCO world heritage sites nearby. The closest heritage site in Poland is the  Historic Centre of Kraków south of Kotków at a distance of 78 mi (or 125 km).

References

Villages in Piotrków County